Alan L. Light (b. September 15, 1953) is a publisher involved in comics and pop culture fandom. He is best known as the founder of The Buyer's Guide for Comic Fandom (later known as the Comics Buyer's Guide), which was the longest-running English-language periodical reporting on the American comic book industry.

Publishing ventures 
Light grew up in the Quad Cities region of Illinois and Iowa; his first foray into publishing was as a 16-year-old when he produced the comics fanzine All Dynamic Magazine.

The Buyer's Guide for Comic Fandom 
As a 17-year-old in February 1971, Light founded The Buyer's Guide for Comic Fandom (TBG) as a tabloid-format monthly newspaper. Run out of Light's parents' basement in East Moline, Illinois, TBG began primarily as an advertising venue – known in comics fandom as an "adzine", i.e. a fanzine devoted to ads.

TBG's frequency was soon changed to twice-monthly, and prominent fans Don and Maggie Thompson began a monthly column, "Beautiful Balloons." The Thompsons administered the Goethe Awards, which originated with their fanzine Newfangles and then shared close ties with TBG. (Perhaps not coincidentally, TBG was given the Goethe Award for Favorite Fanzine in 1972.)

A news column, "What Now?" by Murray Bishoff, was added with issue #26; the Thompsons' and Bishoff's columns provided the editorial content required by the United States Postal Service to qualify for second class mail (along with paid subscriptions being instituted). TBG went weekly in July 1975.

According to the Los Angeles Times, Light "recorded all of the panels and speeches" at the 1975 San Diego Comic-Con "and put together highlights for a limited-edition 12-inch LP record that also featured an interview with Superman co-creator Jerry Siegel." (Light was given an Inkpot Award at the 1975 San Diego Comic-Con.)

Besides Bishoff and the Thompsons, other columnists and contributors to TBG included Martin L. Greim, Shel Dorf, Peter David, Tony Isabella, Catherine Yronwode, and Heidi MacDonald; as well as cartoonists such as Marc Hansen, Dan Vebber, Fred Hembeck, Mark Martin, and Batton Lash.

By 1976, Light had moved The Buyer's Guide headquarters to Rapids City, Illinois.

Light sold The Buyer's Guide to Krause Publications in 1983, having published 481 issues. Kraus rechristened the publication The Comics Buyer's Guide and continued it until 2013; altogether the journal published 1,699 issues.

DynaPubs Enterprises 
Concurrently with publishing TBG, Light founded DynaPubs Enterprises, whose main business was publishing black-and-white reprints of material from the Golden Age of Comic Books. Flashback featured reprints of Golden Age superhero comics; DynaPubs longest-running series was Vintage Funnies, which published 85 issues (it had been preceded by Golden Funnies). Light operated DynaPubs from 1971 to 1976.

DynaPubs Titles published 
 Favorite Funnies (12 issues, Sept. 14, 1973 – Dec. 1973) — preceded by Golden Funnies
 Feature Showcase (2 issues, 1974) — Buck Rogers and other classic comic strip reprints
 Flashback vol. 1 (2 issues, 1971)
 Flashback vol. 2 (38 issues, Nov. 1973 – 1976)
 Golden Funnies (15 issues, June 1, 1973 – Sept. 7, 1973) — succeeded by Favorite Funnies and Vintage Funnies
 Special Edition Series (3 issues, 1974 – 1975) — Fawcett Comics and Quality Comics reprints
 Vintage Funnies (85 issues, Sept. 14, 1973 – Apr. 25, 1975) — preceded by Golden Funnies

Film Collector's World 
In 1976, Light added another tabloid to his publishing roster: Film Collector's World (FCW), which was at first edited by Don and Maggie Thompson, and later by Rick Best. FCW featured, among other items, the Thompsons' regular column, "View from a Darkened Room." 

Krause Publications bought Film Collector's World along with The Buyer's Guide in 1983; FCW was rechristened Movie Collector's World. Much later, the magazine was acquired by, and absorbed into, Classic Images.

Feud with Gary Groth 
Gary Groth, publisher of The Nostalgia Journal (later renamed The Comics Journal), initiated a long-running feud with Light in 1976. (This came after Light allegedly offered to buy the competing Nostalgia Journal for $12,000 in 1975.) Groth's first editorial in The New Nostalgia Journal, in issue #27 (July 1976), called out Light for what Groth claimed were his "expedient" business practices, and the accusations continued for a number of years afterward.

Groth and Light, both teenage fanzine publishers at the time, had been friends before Light published the final issue of Groth's comics fanzine, Fantastic Fanzine. Ron Frantz's history of the WE Seal of approval program (WSA), Fandom: Confidential, outlines Groth's confrontations with Light at conventions and via late-night collect calls. Light in turn cashed a check for a Comics Journal advertisement that he refused to print. Groth acquired a copy of the WSA mailing list, and without authorization, used it to solicit subscriptions; Groth later apologized for what he claimed was a misunderstanding, and soon after broke ties with WSA. 

In 1983, when Light sold The Buyer's Guide, a Groth editorial denounced Light, calling him "fandom's first real business predator. His career of hustling is a monument to selfish opportunism and spiritual squalor." As a result, Light filed a libel suit against Groth, claiming that he had damaged Light's reputation; the suit was eventually dropped.

Later activities 
Light's sales of his publications to Kraus in 1983 enabled him to pursue his interest in photographing film and pop music celebrities. He attended the Grammy Awards, Emmy Awards, and Academy Awards on a number of occasions.

Light later retired to Iowa City, Iowa.

Awards 
For his work promoting comics fandom, Light was given an Inkpot Award at the 1975 San Diego Comic-Con.

Further reading 
 Comic Book Marketplace #58 (Apr. 1998)
 Dean, Michael. "Born of Bile: Newswatch Examines Its Own Navel," The Comics Journal (August 22, 2000).
 John Jackson Miller, Maggie Thompson and Brent Frankenhoff. "Weeks of Wonder: The TBG Years. A Guide to The Buyer's Guide for Comic Fandom 1971–1983". Comics Buyer's Guide 1997 Annual, pp. 59–101.
 Schelly, Bill. The Golden Age of Comic Fandom (Hamster Press, 1995)  — biographical entry

References

Citations

Sources

External links 
 "DynaPubs - TBG days: Photos from the TBG - DynaPubs days, 1971 to 1983" by Alan Light
 Light's celebrity photographs on Wikimedia Commons
 Editorial, Nostalgia Journal #27 by Gary Groth

1953 births
Living people
Inkpot Award winners